Makhan Lal Fotedar (born 5 March 1932 in Mattan village, Anantnag, Kashmir – died 28 September 2017 in Gurgaon, Haryana) was a Indian politician who was a senior leader of the Indian National Congress political party. He was a close aide of the Nehru–Gandhi family, especially Indira Gandhi.  
 
He was also a leader of the Kashmiri Pandits. He had been a  cabinet minister in the Government of India and had held important cabinet posts.

From 1967 to 1977, he was member of Jammu and Kashmir Legislative Assembly from the Pahalgam constituency and was also cabinet minister in the government of Jammu and Kashmir under Syed Mir Qasim. He had been an MP from Rajya Sabha from 1985 to 1996. He was known as the Chanakya of Indian politics in the eyes of Congress party.

He resigned from the Indian National Congress after the 1992 demolition of the Babri Masjid and also resigned from P V Narasimha Rao's cabinet. Then along with N. D. Tiwari and Arjun Singh, he split from All India Indira Congress (Tiwari) but returned to Indian National Congress after Sonia Gandhi took over as congress President.

He died on 28 September 2017, at a hospital in Gurgaon on the outskirts of Delhi. He was living in Gurgaon, Haryana with his family, and was survived by three sons and two daughters.

References

External links 
parliament debate

1932 births
2017 deaths
Kashmiri Pandits
Indian people of Kashmiri descent
Indian National Congress politicians
Rajya Sabha members from Uttar Pradesh
All India Indira Congress (Tiwari) politicians
Jammu and Kashmir MLAs 1967–1972
Jammu and Kashmir MLAs 1972–1977
People from Anantnag district